Achinos may refer to:
 Achinos, Phthiotis — a village and community in Central Greece
 Achinos, Serres — a village and a former municipality in Central Macedonia